The London Independent Film Festival is a British film festival that takes place annually in April.  It was founded by Erich Schultz and specialises in low-budget independent films.  It offers a screenplay competition and distribution fair.

History
Founded in 2004, the London Independent Film Festival provides a showcase for over 100 independent films, presented over a two-week period in April on the South Bank of the River Thames.

Awards
Awards submissions are made through the online portal Film Freeway, and open in October, closing in February of the following year. Fees range from £65 for feature films to £25 for short shorts.

Awards categories include:
Best Low-budget Feature (over £100k)
Best Micro-budget Feature (under £100k)
Best No-Budget Feature (under £10k)
Best UK Feature
Best Documentary
Best Sci-Fi / Horror Feature
Best Female Director Feature
Best LGBT film
Best Short Film
Best UK Short
Best Short Documentary
Best Animated Short
Best Experimental Short
Best Short Short
Best Horror / Sci-Fi Short
Best Music Video

See also
 BFI London Film Festival
 London International Animation Festival
 London International Student Film Festival
 London Short Film Festival
 UK Film Festival

References

External links 
 

Film festivals in London
2004 establishments in England
Film festivals established in 2004